Palra is the name of the following Indian villages:

 Palra, Gurgaon, Haryana
 Palra (Jhajjar), Haryana, birthplace of Victoria Cross recipient Umrao Singh
 Palra (Hamirpur), Uttar Pradesh
 Palra, Jhansi, Uttar Pradesh
 Palra (Meerut), Uttar Pradesh
 Palra (Muzaffarnagar), Uttar Pradesh, important to the Muley Jats

See also
 , an Asturian-Leonese-Extremaduran dialect spoken in El Rebollar, Salamanca, Spain